Moqilan (also Romanized as Moqīlān, Maghīlān, and Magīlān) is a village in Zohan Rural District, Zohan District, Zirkuh County, South Khorasan Province, Iran. At the 2006 census, its population was 242, in 78 families.

References 

Populated places in Zirkuh County